Joseph Andrew "Grindy" Forrester (July 11, 1877 – November 8, 1932) was a Canadian professional ice hockey player. He played with the Montreal Shamrocks of the National Hockey Association. He also played with the Portage Lakes Hockey Club in the IPHL, the Winnipeg Maple Leafs in the MPHL and the Pittsburgh Athletic Club in the WPHL.

According to former ice hockey player and coach Jack Adams, Grindy Forrester had one of the hardest shots during his era.

Statistics

Statistics per Society for International Hockey Research at sihrhockey.org

References

External links
Grindy Forrester at JustSportsStats

1877 births
1932 deaths
Canadian ice hockey defencemen
Ice hockey people from Simcoe County
Montreal Shamrocks players
Portage Lakes Hockey Club players
Pittsburgh Athletic Club (ice hockey) players
Sportspeople from Barrie
Winnipeg Maple Leafs players